The Ministry of Defence of Eritrea is an Eritrean government agency responsible for the public finance policies of Eritrea. It is responsible for maintaining the Eritrean Defence Forces. The ministry is located in Asmara.

Authority 
It is responsible for the overseeing of the transfer of national service soldiers to the regular army as well as assign members of the national service.

Ministers of Defence
Petros Solomon (1993-1994)
Mesfin Hagos (1994-1995)
Sebhat Ephrem (1995–2013)
Filipos Woldeyohannes (since 2014)

See also 
 Eritrean Defence Forces
 Government of Eritrea
Cabinet of Ministers of Eritrea

References

External links
 

Eritrea
Government of Eritrea
1993 establishments in Eritrea
Military of Eritrea